Aristotelia chrysometra is a moth of the family Gelechiidae. It was described by Edward Meyrick in 1926. It is found in Ecuador.

The wingspan is about 7 mm. The forewings are shining golden bronze with golden-white, black-edged markings. There is a slender oblique transverse fasciae at one-fourth and before the middle, as well as short oblique streaks from the costa beyond the middle and at three-fourths, as well as a short inwards-oblique streak from the costa before the apex. A triangular dot is found on the dorsum between the first and second of these streaks, and a smaller dot between the second and third. There is also a minute apical dot. The hindwings are dark fuscous.

References

Moths described in 1926
Aristotelia (moth)
Moths of South America